Velikoye is a rural locality (a selo) in Nikolskoye Rural Settlement, Kaduysky District, Vologda Oblast, Russia. The population was 126 as of 2002. There are 6 streets.

Geography 
Velikoye is located 46 km north of Kaduy (the district's administrative centre) by road. Pochinok is the nearest rural locality.

References 

Rural localities in Kaduysky District